Azaz District is a district of Aleppo Governorate in northern Syria. The administrative centre is the city of Azaz. At the 2004 census, the district had a population of 251,769.
 
The district lies between Afrin District to the west, Mount Simeon District to the south and al-Bab District to the east. To the north is the Kilis Province of Turkey.

Subdistricts

References

 
Districts of Aleppo Governorate